Gravitcornutia curiosa is a species of moth of the family Tortricidae. It is found in Santa Catarina, Brazil.

References

Moths described in 2001
Gravitcornutia
Moths of South America
Taxa named by Józef Razowski